The Journey of Punjab 2016 is a 2016 Punjabi film directed by Inderjit Moga and Balraj Sagar. It is written by Deep Jagdeep. The film is about the menace of drug in the Indian state of Punjab.

Plot
The film revolves around four Punjabi youngsters.

Cast
 Rana Ranbir as Raj Rai, minister
 Rahul Jugral as Chandigarhiya
 Surjit Singh Sidhu as Bai Ji
 Anita Meet
 Gurchet Chitarkar
 Gurpreet Bhangu
Mintu kapa

Pre-Production and Production
Red Arts Punjab started its journey by doing a series of performances of the play Aakhir Kadon Tak at various places in Punjab and its neighboring states.

The idea of making a film materialized after Surjeet Singh Sidhu, a college principal, agreed to produce it. The story of the play Aakhir Kadon Tak was then transformed into the screenplay by Inderjit Moga.

References

2016 films
Punjabi-language Indian films
2010s Punjabi-language films